The European Parliamentary Labour Party (EPLP) was the parliamentary party of the British Labour Party in the European Parliament. The EPLP was part of the pan-European Group of Socialists and Democrats (S&D), (with MEPs from sister parties such as the French Socialist Party, the German SPD, the Swedish Social Democrats and Dutch Labour Party), and which is the parliamentary wing of the Party of European Socialists (PES), to which Labour was (and remains) affiliated.  

Like other national delegations, the EPLP had its own leadership and spokespeople representing Labour in Brussels and Strasbourg (and the EPLP in the UK).

The EPLP ceased to exist after the UK left the European Union in January 2020. At the time of dissolution, Labour had 10 Members of the European Parliament.

Leader
The leader of the EPLP had a seat on the Labour Party National Executive Committee and attended shadow cabinet meetings.

List of Leaders of the European Parliamentary Labour Party

Positions in the European Parliament and related bodies
Labour figures held, over the years of UK membership, a number of key positions in the EU, including many held by Labour MEPs in the European Parliament. These included:

1 leader of the S&D Group Pauline Green
14 Vice-presidents of the Parliament, including the longest serving one ever, David Martin
12 Chairs of Parliamentary committees, including the longest serving Ken Collins
The European Parliament's rapporteurs on the Maastricht Treaty, the Amsterdam Treaty, the Constitutional Treaty and the Lisbon Treaty David Martin and Richard Corbett
The draftsman of the revised Rules of Procedure of the European Parliament  Richard Corbett
2 Secretaries General of the Group  Julian Priestley and David Harley
1 Secretary General of the Parliament Julian Priestley 
1 President of the PES Robin Cook
1 President of the Commission Roy Jenkins
1 EU High Representative for Foreign Affairs Cathy Ashton
EPLP members were frequently elected as the S&D Group's Committee Co-ordinators, acting as spokespeople for the  Group in their respective parliamentary committees and on the subjects they covered.

External links
http://www.eurolabour.org.uk/

Organisation of the Labour Party (UK)
Party of European Socialists